Emma Leavitt-Morgan (née Leavitt; May 22, 1865 – December 29, 1956) was an American tennis and golf player, often listed as Mrs. W. Fellowes-Morgan.

Biography
Mary Emma Leavitt was born in Great Barrington, Massachusetts, the daughter of Henry Sheldon Leavitt and Martha Ann Young Leavitt. She was married to William Fellowes Morgan, Sr. in 1885. They had three children. Their daughters were Polly and Beatrice. Their son was William Fellowes Morgan Jr. 

She died in 1956, aged 91 years. Her gravesite is in Green-Wood Cemetery in Brooklyn, New York.

Sports 
With Mabel Cahill, Emma Leavitt-Morgan won, in 1891, the third women's doubles of the American National Championships, what is now the US Open. She was also a golfer, a member of the Baltusrol Golf Club.

Grand Slam finals

Doubles (1 title)

Notes

References

External links 
 
An 1883 portrait of Emma Leavitt, in the collection of the Museum of the City of New York.

American female tennis players
United States National champions (tennis)
Grand Slam (tennis) champions in women's doubles
Tennis people from Massachusetts
American female golfers
Amateur golfers
Golfers from Massachusetts
People from Great Barrington, Massachusetts
19th-century American people
19th-century female tennis players
1865 births
1956 deaths